Haja Amina Appi (June 25, 1925 – April 2, 2013) was a Filipino master mat weaver and teacher from the Sama indigenous people of Ungos Matata, Tandubas, Tawi-Tawi. She was credited for creating colorful pandan mats with complex geometric patterns. Her creations were acclaimed for their precise sense of design, proportion and symmetry, and sensitivity to color.

She was given the National Living Treasures Award in 2004 by the Philippines through the National Commission for Culture and the Arts.

Background 
Haja Appi was known for creating finely woven mats with highly intricate designs. An older tradition produced Sama mats in plain white. However, Haja Appi experimented with dyes for her designs, mixing her own dyes to create striking designs for her mats.

The entire process of creating mats is handed down exclusively among women among the Sama of Tawi-Tawi. Traditionally it was passed down from mother to daughter. Haja Appi taught many young women in her community the art of mat-making in order to preserve her art for future generations.

References 

National Living Treasures of the Philippines
People from Tawi-Tawi
Filipino weavers
1925 births
2013 deaths
21st-century Filipino artists
20th-century Filipino artists
21st-century women artists
20th-century women artists